Manthrikappoocha (The Magic Cat) is a short novel by Vaikom Muhammad Basheer published in 1968. It is one of the most famous among his works. The story of this novel revolves around a cat came to basheer's house. Also events happened in his and neighbours house with this cat. The narration of the story is filled with pleasant humour and anecdotes from Muslim and Hindu religious lore.

References

Malayalam novels
Novels set in Kerala
Novels by Vaikom Muhammad Basheer
1968 Indian novels